Teddy Pugh (8 December 1878 – 30 July 1958) was a Welsh gymnast. He competed in the men's team all-around event at the 1920 Summer Olympics.

References

1878 births
1958 deaths
Welsh male artistic gymnasts
Olympic gymnasts of Great Britain
Gymnasts at the 1920 Summer Olympics
Sportspeople from Bristol